LSD is a psychedelic drug.

The initialism may also refer to:

Film and television
Love Sex aur Dhokha, a 2010 film by Dibakar Banerjee
"Lysergic Acid Diethylamide" (Fringe)

Music
Lake Street Dive, an American band
Left Spine Down, a Canadian cyberpunk band
LSD (group), a musical supergroup

Albums
LSD (album), 2019, by LSD
LSD (Cardiacs album)

Songs
 "LSD" (song), a 2015 song by ASAP Rocky
 "£.s.d.", a song by the Pretty Things, the B-side to the song "Come See Me", 1966
 "L.S.D.", a song by Hawkwind from the album Electric Tepee, 1992

Songs rumoured to allude to LSD
 "Lucy in the Sky with Diamonds", 1967
 "Love to Say Dada", 1993
 "Lake Shore Drive" (song), 1972

Organizations
League of Social Democrats, a political party in Hong Kong
League for Spiritual Discovery
Louisiana School for the Deaf, Baton Rouge, US
Lutheran School For The Deaf, Kwai Chung, Hong Kong

Science and technology 
 Language for Systems Development, a programming language
 Laser Schlieren Deflectometry, for gas temperature measurement
 Least significant digit
 Lightweight Service Discovery
 Limit state design in structural engineering
 Limited slip differential, for vehicles
 Local Peer Discovery, or Local Service Discovery
 Line sharing device or modem sharing device
 Linear slot HVAC diffuser
 Log-spectral distance or log-spectral distortion
 Low self-discharge NiMH battery
 Low sulfur diesel, a fuel
 Lumpy skin disease of cattle
 Lysosomal storage disease, metabolic disorders

Other uses 
 Karolina Dean or LSD,  Marvel Comics character in Runaways
 Lake Shore Drive, Chicago, U.S.
 Landing Ship, Dock, US Navy designation
 Legal subdivision in Dominion Land Survey of Western Canada
 Little Sandy Desert, a desert and bioregion in Western Australia
 "Little" Spike Dudley, US wrestler
 Long slow distance running training
 LSD: Dream Emulator, a 1998 Japanese video game 
 Lsd or £sd, short for "pounds, shillings and pence", a currency system

See also